Optimal matching is a sequence analysis method used in social science, to assess the dissimilarity of ordered arrays of tokens that usually represent a time-ordered sequence of socio-economic states two individuals have experienced. Once such distances have been calculated for a set of observations (e.g. individuals in a cohort) classical tools (such as cluster analysis) can be used. The method was tailored to social sciences from a technique originally introduced to study molecular biology (protein or genetic) sequences (see sequence alignment). Optimal matching uses the Needleman-Wunsch algorithm.

Algorithm 
Let  be a sequence of states  belonging to a finite set of possible states. Let us denote  the sequence space, i.e. the set of all possible sequences of states. 

Optimal matching algorithms work by defining simple operator algebras that manipulate sequences, i.e. a set of operators . In the most simple approach, a set composed of only three basic operations to transform sequences is used: 
 one state  is inserted in the sequence 
 one state is deleted from the sequence  and
 a state  is replaced (substituted) by state , .

Imagine now that a cost   is associated
to each operator.
the idea is to measure the cost of obtaining   from  
using operators from the algebra. Let  be a sequence of operators such that the application of all the operators of this sequence  to the first sequence  gives the second sequence :
 where  denotes the compound operator. 
To this set we associate the cost , that
represents the total cost of the transformation. One should consider at this point that there might exist different such sequences  that transform   into ; a reasonable choice is to select the cheapest of such sequences. We thus
call distance
 
 that is, the cost of the least expensive set of transformations that turn  into . Notice that  is by definition nonnegative since it is the sum of positive costs, and trivially  if and only if , that is there is no cost. The distance function is symmetric if insertion and deletion costs are equal ; the term indel cost usually refers to the common cost of insertion and deletion.

Considering a set composed of only the three basic operations described above, this proximity measure satisfies the triangular inequality. Transitivity however, depends on the definition of the set of elementary operations.

Criticism 
Although optimal matching techniques are widely used in sociology and demography, such techniques also have their flaws.  As was pointed out by several authors (for example L. L. Wu), the main problem in the application of optimal matching is to appropriately define the costs .

Software 
 TDA is a powerful program, offering access to some of the latest developments in transition data analysis.
 STATA has implemented a package to run optimal matching analysis.
 TraMineR is an open source R-package for analyzing and visualizing states and events sequences, including optimal matching analysis.

References and notes 

Data mining
Statistical distance
Quantitative research